Gotan Object is a box set by electro/nuevo tango-band Gotan Project. This box set is in essence an expanded version of the double live album Gotan Project Live released simultaneously. The box set consists of:
- Double CD Gotan Project Live (La Revancha del Tango Tour/Lunático Tour)
- Unreleased 7" vinyl (featuring the 2 bonus tracks from the double live album)
- DVD Visiones (projections used during the tours)
- 152-page photo book titled Carnet de Viajes
- Puzzle poster

Track listing

CD 1: La Revancha del Tango Tour
 "Live Intro" - 1:32	
 "Queremos Paz" - 4:14	
 "Vuelvo Al Sur" - 6:03	
 "El Capitalismo Foraneo" - 5:47	
 "La Del Ruso" - 6:30	
 "Santa María (Del Buen Ayre)" - 8:26	
 "Nocturna" - 2:49	
 "Triptico" - 9:36	
 "Chunga's Revenge" - 5:17	
 "Last Tango in Paris" - 6:19	
 "Sola" - 7:10	
 "Santa María (Del Buen Ayre)" (Versión Orquestal) - 2:57 (Bonus Track)

CD 2: Lunático Tour
 "Diferente" - 6:28	
 "La Vigüela" - 5:36	
 "Amor Porteńo" - 5:24	
 "Época" - 4:57	
 "Notas" - 4:30	
 "Lunático" - 3:17	
 "Che Bandonéon" (Interlude) - 1:21	
 "Una Música Brutal" - 4:02	
 "Santa María (Del Buen Ayre)" - 4:57	
 "Arrabal" - 4:52	
 "El Norte" - 5:14	
 "Criminal" - 3:46	
 "Tríptico" - 9:26	
 "Diferente" (Versión Orquestal) - 4:00 (Bonus Track)

7" Vinyl
 "Santa María (Del Buen Ayre)" (Versión Orquestal) - 2:57
 "Diferente" (Versión Orquestal) - 4:00

DVD: Visiones
 "El Capitalismo Foráneo/Vuelvo Al Sur" (Medley) - 5:23	
 "Tríptico" - 6:21	
 "Una Música Brutal" - 4:02	
 "Santa María (Del Buen Ayre)" - 5:09	
 "Kyrie" - Excerpt from La Misa Criolla - 1:00	
 "Época" - 4:25	
 "Diferente" - 3:33	
 "Lunático" - 3:02	
 "Amor Porteño" - 5:07	
 "Celos" - 2:54	
 "La Vigüela" - 5:02

External links 
 Official site
 Discogs entry

Gotan Project albums
2008 live albums